Journal of Medical Case Reports is an open access peer-reviewed medical journal publishing case reports and research on case reports. It was established in 2007 and is published by BioMed Central. The editor-in-chief is Michael Kidd (University of Sydney). The journal is abstracted and indexed in CINAHL and Scopus.

References

External links
 

General medical journals
BioMed Central academic journals
Creative Commons-licensed journals
Publications established in 2007
English-language journals
Case report journals
Open access journals